"Respect My Cryppin'" (also titled "Respect My Crypn") is a song by American rapper Blueface. It was released on May 26, 2018 as the second single from his debut mixtape Famous Cryp (2018). In October 2018, the song went viral after its music video was released, leading to Blueface's rise to fame.

Background
On October 8, 2018, the music video was uploaded onto WorldstarHipHop's YouTube channel. The song quickly became a viral Internet meme due to Blueface's style of offbeat rapping, and eventually led to more of his music receiving attention. The video gained two million views on YouTube in a month.

The lyrics "Mop the floor, hide the wet sign just to catch him slippin'" received the most attention.

Composition
In the song, Blueface expresses loyalty to the Crips gang and demands respect for his gang affiliation. The instrumental was produced by Laudiano and contains an "excessively vibrant, fluid thing with a sticky bass drum".

Music video
The music video was released on October 8, 2018. It sees Blueface hanging with fellow Crips and them flashing gang signs.

Remix
The official remix of the song features American rapper Snoop Dogg, and was released on July 24, 2020 as a track from the reloaded edition of Famous Cryp. Two music videos of the remix have been released. The first is computer-animated and features "electric blue graphics". In the second, Bluefaces challenges Snoop Dogg to a basketball competition.

References

2018 singles
2018 songs
Blueface songs
Crips
Internet memes introduced in 2018